Demologos was the first warship to be propelled by a steam engine. She was a wooden floating battery built to defend New York Harbor from the Royal Navy during the War of 1812. The vessel was designed to a unique pattern by Robert Fulton, and was renamed Fulton after his death. Because of the prompt end of the war, Demologos never saw action, and no other ship like her was built.

History

On 9 March 1814, Congress authorized the construction of a steam warship to be designed by Robert Fulton, a pioneer of commercial steamers in North America. The construction of the ship began on 20 June 1814, at the civilian yard of Adam and Noah Brown, and the ship was launched on 29 October. After sea trials she was delivered to the United States Navy in June 1816. The ship was never formally named; Fulton christened it Demologos or Demologus, though following his death in February 1815, the ship was named Fulton.

By the time she was completed, the war for which Demologos had been built had ended. She saw only one day of active service, when she carried President James Madison on a tour of New York Harbor. A two-masted lateen rig was added by the orders of her first commander, Captain David Porter. In 1821 her armament and machinery were removed. The remainder of her career was spent laid up in reserve; after 1825 she served as the floating barracks for Brooklyn Navy Yard. She came to an end on 4 June 1829 in a gunpowder explosion. She exploded while lying at anchor, killing an officer and 47 men.

Design and impact
Demologos had a unique and innovative design. A catamaran, her paddlewheel was sandwiched between two hulls. The steam engine, mounted below the waterline in one of the hulls, was capable of giving  speed in favorable conditions. Although designed to carry 30 32-pounder guns, 24 port and starboard, 6 fore and aft, the Navy had trouble acquiring sufficient guns, and a varying number were mounted while in actual service. Demologos was also fitted for two 100-pounder columbiads, one mounted fore and another aft, these weapons were never actually installed.

Fulton's design solved several of the problems inherent in warships powered by paddlewheels which led to the adoption of the paddle-steamer as an effective warship in following decades. By placing the paddlewheel centrally, sandwiched between two hulls, Fulton protected it from gunfire; this design also allowed the ship to mount a full broadside of guns.

The steam engine offered the prospect of tactical advantage against sail-powered warships. In a calm, sailing ships depended on the manpower of their crews to tow the ship from the boats, or to kedge with anchors. Demologos, with steam, might have found it easy to outmaneuver a ship-of-the-line in calm weather.

The innovative construction and steam power also fundamentally limited the role Demologos could fill. With an unreliable engine and a hull unsuited to seaways, Demologos was unable to travel on the high seas. A number of European navies also considered acquiring the Demologos, but these inquiries came to nought.

The Demologos was ultimately a dead end in the introduction of steam power to the warship. Armed paddle steamers proliferated in the 1830s and 1840s as armed tugs and transports. During the Civil War, the United States Navy operated a number of iron clad steam-powered paddle-wheel gunboats as a part of the Mississippi River Squadron. Known as City-class ironclad gunboats as they were named after cities on the Mississippi River or its tributaries, these ships utilized a double-hulled configuration similar to Fulton's design, with the paddle wheel in the center. The wheel was protected by armored plate, allowing full broad-sides, as well as bow and stern shots. An example, is on display at the Vicksburg National Military Park. These designs were typically limited to use in the brown-water navy or on large lakes.

Steam-powered paddle wheel propulsion would ultimately be eclipsed by the introduction of the screw propeller in the 1840s, enabling steam-powered version of the ship of the line and the frigate before steam power was properly adapted for use in a blue water navy.

References

Further reading

Canney, Donald L. The Old Steam Navy, Volume One: Frigates, Sloops, and Gunboats 1815-1885. Annapolis, Maryland: Naval Institute Press, 1990. 
Lambert, Andrew "The Introduction of Steam" in Gardiner (ed) Steam, Steel and Shellfire: The Steam Warship 1815-1905, Conway, London 1992. 
"Fulton", US Navy Historical Center, retrieved 25 June 2007

Steamships of the United States Navy
Ships built in New York (state)
1815 ships
Maritime incidents in June 1829
Floating batteries of the United States Navy